Ralph de Heyham was an English medieval ecclesiastical chancellor and university chancellor.

Ralph de Heyham was Chancellor of Salisbury. Between 1240 and 1244, he was Chancellor of Oxford University.

References

Year of birth unknown
Year of death unknown
English Roman Catholics
Chancellors of the University of Oxford
13th-century English people
13th-century Roman Catholics
Salisbury Cathedral